The  is a residential building in the Koto special ward of Tokyo, Japan. Completed in September 2006, it stands at 144.4 m (474 ft) tall.

See also 
 List of tallest structures in Tokyo

References

Residential buildings completed in 2006
Residential skyscrapers in Tokyo
Buildings and structures in Koto, Tokyo
2006 establishments in Japan